The 1977 Bowling Green Falcons football team was an American football team that represented Bowling Green University in the Mid-American Conference (MAC) during the 1977 NCAA Division I football season. In their first season under head coach Denny Stolz, the Falcons compiled a 5–7 record (4–3 against MAC opponents), finished in a tie for fourth place in the MAC, and were outscored by their opponents by a combined total of 296 to 275.

The team's statistical leaders included Mark Miller with 2,103 passing yards, Dan Saleet with 572 rushing yards, and Jeff Groth with 693 receiving yards.

Schedule

References

Bowling Green
Bowling Green Falcons football seasons
Bowling Green Falcons football